The Herpomycetaceae are a family of fungi in the order Laboulbeniales. Taxa have a widespread distribution, and are ectoparasitic or epibiotic on cockroaches (family Blattidae).

References

Laboulbeniomycetes
Ascomycota families